The Great Calcite Belt (GCB) of the Southern Ocean is a region of elevated summertime upper ocean calcite concentration derived from coccolithophores, despite the region being known for its diatom predominance. The overlap of two major phytoplankton groups, coccolithophores and diatoms, in the dynamic frontal systems characteristic of this region provides an ideal setting to study environmental influences on the distribution of different species within these taxonomic groups.

The Great Calcite Belt, defined as an elevated particulate inorganic carbon (PIC) feature occurring alongside seasonally elevated chlorophyll a in austral spring and summer in the Southern Ocean, plays an important role in climate fluctuations, accounting for over 60% of the Southern Ocean area (30–60° S). The region between 30° and 50° S has the highest uptake of anthropogenic carbon dioxide (CO2) alongside the North Atlantic and North Pacific oceans. Knowledge of the impact of interacting environmental influences on phytoplankton distribution in the Southern Ocean is limited. For example, more understanding is needed of how light and iron availability or temperature and pH interact to control phytoplankton biogeography. Hence, if model parameterizations are to improve to provide accurate predictions of biogeochemical change, a multivariate understanding of the full suite of environmental drivers is required.

Background

The Southern Ocean has often been considered as a microplankton-dominated (20–200 µm) system with phytoplankton blooms dominated by large diatoms and Phaeocystis sp.  However, since the identification of the Great Calcite Belt (GCB) as a consistent feature and the recognition of picoplankton (< 2 µm) and nanoplankton (2–20 µm) importance in high-nutrient, low-chlorophyll (HNLC) waters, the dynamics of small (bio)mineralizing plankton and their export need to be acknowledged. The two dominant biomineralizing phytoplankton groups in the GCB are coccolithophores and diatoms. Coccolithophores are generally found north of the polar front, though Emiliania huxleyi has been observed as far south as 58° S in the Scotia Sea, at 61° S across Drake Passage, and at 65°S south of Australia.

Diatoms are present throughout the GCB, with the polar front marking a strong divide between different size fractions. North of the polar front, small diatom species, such as Pseudo-nitzschia spp. and Thalassiosira spp., tend to dominate numerically, whereas large diatoms with higher silicic acid requirements (e.g., Fragilariopsis kerguelensis) are generally more abundant south of the polar front. High abundances of nanoplankton (coccolithophores, small diatoms, chrysophytes) have also been observed on the Patagonian Shelf and in the Scotia Sea. Currently, few studies incorporate small biomineralizing phytoplankton to species level. Rather, the focus has often been on the larger and noncalcifying species in the Southern Ocean due to sample preservation issues (i.e., acidified Lugol’s solution dissolves calcite, and light microscopy restricts accurate identification to cells > 10 µm. In the context of climate change and future ecosystem function, the distribution of biomineralizing phytoplankton is important to define when considering phytoplankton interactions with carbonate chemistry, and ocean biogeochemistry.

The Great Calcite Belt spans the major Southern Ocean circumpolar fronts: the Subantarctic front, the polar front, the Southern Antarctic Circumpolar Current front, and occasionally the southern boundary of the Antarctic Circumpolar Current. The subtropical front (at approximately 10 °C) acts as the northern boundary of the GCB and is associated with a sharp increase in PIC southwards. These fronts divide distinct environmental and biogeochemical zones, making the GCB an ideal study area to examine controls on phytoplankton communities in the open ocean. A high PIC concentration observed in the GCB (1 µmol PIC L−1) compared to the global average (0.2 µmol PIC L−1) and significant quantities of detached E. huxleyi coccoliths (in concentrations > 20,000 coccoliths mL−1) both characterize the GCB. The GCB is clearly observed in satellite imagery spanning from the Patagonian Shelf across the Atlantic, Indian, and Pacific oceans and completing Antarctic circumnavigation via the Drake Passage.

Coccolithophores versus the diatom

The biogeography of Southern Ocean phytoplankton controls the local biogeochemistry and the export of macronutrients to lower latitudes and depth. Of particular relevance is the competitive interaction between coccolithophores and diatoms, with the former being prevalent along the Great Calcite Belt (40–60°S), while diatoms tend to dominate the regions south of 60°S, as illustrated in the diagram on the right.

The ocean is changing at an unprecedented rate as a consequence of increasing anthropogenic CO2 emissions and related climate change. Changes in density stratification and nutrient supply, as well as ocean acidification, lead to changes in phytoplankton community composition and consequently ecosystem structure and function. Some of these changes are already observable today and may have cascading effects on global biogeochemical cycles and oceanic carbon uptake. Changes in Southern Ocean (SO) biogeography are especially critical due to the importance of the Southern Ocean in fuelling primary production at lower latitudes through the lateral export of nutrients and in taking up anthropogenic CO2. For the carbon cycle, the ratio of calcifying and noncalcifying phytoplankton is crucial due to the counteracting effects of calcification and photosynthesis on seawater pCO2, which ultimately controls CO2 exchange with the atmosphere, and the differing ballasting effect of calcite and silicic acid shells for organic carbon export.

Calcifying coccolithophores and silicifying diatoms are globally ubiquitous phytoplankton functional groups. Diatoms are a major contributor to global phytoplankton biomass and annual net primary production. In comparison, coccolithophores contribute less to biomass and to global NPP.

However, coccolithophores are the major phytoplanktonic calcifier. thereby significantly impacting the global carbon cycle. Diatoms dominate the phytoplankton community in the Southern Ocean, but coccolithophores have received increasing attention in recent years. Satellite imagery of particulate inorganic carbon (PIC, a proxy for coccolithophore abundance) revealed the "Great Calcite Belt", an annually reoccurring circumpolar band of elevated PIC concentrations between 40 and 60°S. In situ observations confirmed coccolithophore abundances of up to 2.4×103 cells mL−1 in the Atlantic sector (blooms on the Patagonian Shelf), up to 3.8×102 cells mL−1 in the Indian sector, and up to 5.4×102 cells mL−1 in the Pacific sector of the Southern Ocean with Emiliania huxleyi being the dominant species. However, the contribution of coccolithophores to total Southern Ocean phytoplankton biomass and NPP has not yet been assessed. Locally, elevated coccolithophore abundance in the GCB has been found to turn surface waters into a source of CO2 for the atmosphere, emphasising the necessity to understand the controls on their abundance in the Southern Ocean in the context of the carbon cycle and climate change. While coccolithophores have been observed to have moved polewards in recent decades, their response to the combined effects of future warming and ocean acidification is still subject to debate. As their response will also crucially depend on future phytoplankton community composition and predator–prey interactions, it is essential to assess the controls on their abundance in today's climate.

Top-down and bottom-up approaches

Coccolithophore biomass is controlled by a combination of bottom-up (physical–biogeochemical environment) and top-down factors (predator–prey interactions), but the relative importance of the two has not yet been assessed for coccolithophores in the Southern Ocean. Bottom-up factors directly impact phytoplankton growth, and diatoms and coccolithophores are traditionally discriminated based on their differing requirements for nutrients, turbulence, and light. Based on this, Margalef's mandala predicts a seasonal succession from diatoms to coccolithophores as light levels increase and nutrient levels decline. In situ studies assessing Southern Ocean coccolithophore biogeography have found coccolithophores under various environmental conditions, thus suggesting a wide ecological niche, but all of the mentioned studies have almost exclusively focused on bottom-up controls.

However, phytoplankton growth rates do not necessarily covary with biomass accumulation rates. Using satellite data from the North Atlantic, Behrenfeld stressed in 2014 the importance of simultaneously considering bottom-up and top-down factors when assessing seasonal phytoplankton biomass dynamics and the succession of different phytoplankton types owing to the spatially and temporally varying relative importance of the physical–biogeochemical and the biological environment.

 

In the Southern Ocean, previous studies have shown zooplankton grazing to control total phytoplankton biomass, phytoplankton community composition, and ecosystem structure, suggesting that top-down control might also be an important driver for the relative abundance of coccolithophores and diatoms. But the role of zooplankton grazing in current Earth system models is not well considered, and the impact of different grazing formulations on phytoplankton biogeography and diversity is subject to ongoing research.

The diagram on the left shows the spatial distribution of different types of marine sediments in the Southern Ocean. The greenish area south of the Polar Front shows the extension of the subpolar opal belt where sediments have a significant portion of silicous plankton frustules. Sediments near Antarctica mainly consist of glacial debris in any grain size eroded and delivered by the Antarctic Ice.

See also
 Great Atlantic Sargassum Belt
 Milky seas effect

References

Chemical oceanography